En Cuerpo Ajeno (literally, "In a borrowed body") is a 1992 Spanish-language telenovela from original idea written by Julio Jiménez, produced by RTI Producciones (Formerly RTI Television), filmed in Colombia.

Plot  
Pedro José Donoso (Julio Medina), an older wealthy and widowed businessman marries his assistant even at the risk of straining his relationship with his daughter and being judged by society. After the marriage Donoso starts experiencing agitated strange nightmares with recurrent scenes of peasant and country life and a woman calling "Salvador" in the distance.

Meanwhile his new wife, Isabel Arroyo (Amparo Grisales) plots to poison him and inherit. Aided by her lover, company executive and Donoso´s protégée, Andres Coronado (Armando Gutierrez) with whom she plans to remarry.

Donoso has an argument with his daughter, which is used by Isabel to poison him. He retires to his study with pain in his chest where he plays his piano and dies. Simultaneously, the mysterious peasant suffers a stroke and in the middle of the procession of his funeral awakens. Donoso had reincarnated in the young and handsome peasant to discover he was murdered.

Donoso, now Salvador Cerinza (Danilo Santos), escapes the village to avenge his death and treason and becomes chauffeur to Isabel. Once in the manor he enters the sealed study through a secret passage and starts playing the same melody as when he died to torment his murderer.

Salvador uses his closeness and manipulates inside knowledge to enamour Isabel.  A tormentous love affair ensues. Salvador regains control of his wealth and remarries Isabel to later reveal to his daughter that she was not the cause of his stroke and reveal his true murderers and die.

Cast 
 Amparo Grisales as Isabel Arroyo de Donoso / de Coronado / de Cerinza
 Armando Gutiérrez as Andrés Coronado
 Danilo Santos as Salvador Cerinza / Pedro José Donoso
Julio Medina as Pedro José Donoso
 Maribel Abello as Abigaíl Domínguez
 Ramiro Meneses as Simón Domínguez
 Alvaro Bayona as Walter Franco
 Érika Shütz as Ángela Donoso
 Carlos Congote as Antonio Domínguez
 Liesel Potdevin as Valeria
 Lucy Martínez as Gaetana Charrie
 Julio Pachón as Jardinero
 Constanza Gutiérrez as Cantalicia Muñetón
 Samara de Córdova as Rebeca Macedo 
 María Eugenia Arboleda as Lupe
 Rosalba Goenaga
 Iris Oyola
 Delfina Guido
 Stella Rivero
 John Alex Toro
 José Rojas
 Marcela Carvajal

See also 
El Cuerpo del Deseo

References

External links

Entrevista a Julio Medina
Facebook Page En Cuerpo Ajeno

Colombian telenovelas
Spanish-language telenovelas
1992 telenovelas
1992 Colombian television series debuts